Emma Gannon  (16 June 1989) is a writer, broadcaster, podcaster who is best known for her Webby nominated podcast Ctrl Alt Delete and Sunday Times Bestselling business book The Multi-Hyphen Method. In 2018, She was one of Forbes 30 Under 30 in media and marketing. The Evening Standard called her ‘the spokesperson for the internet generation.’

Early life
Gannon grew up in Exeter, Devon. She attended The Maynard School in Exeter. She was recently featured in the Maynard Magazine ‘The Word’ in the article ‘Old Maynardians with their own businesses’. She studied English and Film at the University of Southampton.

Early career
At the age of 21 Gannon moved to London and took her first job working at the Hill & Knowlton agency working on P&G PR campaigns.

Writing career
In 2015, Gannon landed a book deal off the back off her then blog Girl Lost In The City, called Ctrl Alt Delete: How I Grew Up Online. Her first book Ctrl Alt Delete came out in 2016 with Ebury, Penguin Random House. In 2017, Gannon signed a book deal with Hodder & Stoughton for The Multi-Hyphen Method, ‘a new business book for the digital age’ which became a Sunday Times Business Bestseller. It also became an immediate no.1 Amazon bestseller and was endorsed by Richard Branson. The Independent voted it one of the ‘10 best business books by women’.

In 2020 she published her debut novel, Olive.

References

External links
 Official Website
 Instagram

British writers
1989 births
Living people
English women novelists